William Radloff (born 20 May 1963) is a South African cricketer. He played in three first-class and two List A matches for Border from 1988/89 to 1992/93.

See also
 List of Border representative cricketers

References

External links
 

1963 births
Living people
South African cricketers
Border cricketers
Cricketers from East London, Eastern Cape